is  the former Head coach of the Shiga Lakestars in the Japanese Bj League. He lived in Takayama, Gifu, from 1997-2000 while serving a Mormon mission and teaching hoops to players ranging in age from elementary school to junior college.

Head coaching record

|- 
| style="text-align:left;"|Shiga Lakestars
| style="text-align:left;"|2013-14
| 52||27||25|||| style="text-align:center;"|3rd in Western|||6||3||3||
| style="text-align:center;"|Lost in 2nd round
|-
|-

References

1968 births
Living people
American Mormon missionaries in Japan
Shiga Lakes coaches